Chioma Nisa Igwe (born July 21, 1986) is an American former soccer midfielder. The San Mateo, California native is a former member of the United States U-20 women's national soccer team.

From the 2011/12 until 2014/15 she played in the German Bundesliga for Freiburg.  In May 2015, it was announced that Igwe had joined SC Sand.

Igwe's father played on the Nigeria national football team after playing at the University of San Francisco (1975 to 1979).
Her name "Chioma" means "God is good" in Igbo.

By the end of 2016/17 season, she announced her retirement from professional soccer, at the age of 30.

References

External links
 US Soccer player profile
 Chicago Red Stars player profile
 SoccerPlus Connecticut player profile
 Santa Clara player profile

1986 births
Living people
California Golden Bears women's soccer players
Santa Clara Broncos women's soccer players
American women's soccer players
Chicago Red Stars players
American sportspeople of Nigerian descent
American people of Igbo descent
Igbo sportspeople
Frauen-Bundesliga players
SC Freiburg (women) players
People from San Mateo, California
Soccer players from California
Women's association football midfielders
American expatriate soccer players in Germany
SC Sand players
American expatriate women's soccer players
Women's Professional Soccer players